Radovan Somík (born 5 May 1977) is a Slovak former professional ice hockey player who played in the National Hockey League (NHL), Slovak Extraliga, Czech Extraliga, Swedish Hockey League, and Russian Super League. He played two NHL seasons for the Philadelphia Flyers from 2002 to 2004. He spent the final seven seasons of his career playing for Pardubice HC in the Czech Extraliga.

Career statistics

Regular season and playoffs

International

External links

 

1977 births
Living people
HC Dynamo Pardubice players
HK Dukla Trenčín players
Malmö Redhawks players
MHC Martin players
Sportspeople from Martin, Slovakia
Philadelphia Flyers draft picks
Philadelphia Flyers players
Philadelphia Phantoms players
PSG Berani Zlín players
Severstal Cherepovets players
Slovak ice hockey left wingers
VHK Vsetín players
Slovak expatriate ice hockey players in the Czech Republic
Slovak expatriate ice hockey players in the United States
Slovak expatriate ice hockey players in Russia
Slovak expatriate ice hockey players in Sweden